The Mill River is a short river in Washington County, Maine. Its lower length forms the border between the towns of Milbridge and Harrington.

See also
List of rivers of Maine

References

Maine Streamflow Data from the USGS
Maine Watershed Data From Environmental Protection Agency

Rivers of Washington County, Maine
Rivers of Maine